In Greek mythology, Pierus was the king of Emathia in Macedonia. He was the eponym of Pieria and Mt. Pierus. Pierus was credited to be the first to write in the praise of the Muses.

Family 
According to Marsyas of Pella (c. 330 BC), Pierus was the son of Makednos by a local woman and brother of Amathus (Emathus), eponym of Emathia but Solinus (9.10) contradicts this idea because according to him Pierus was unrelated and older than Makednos.

In the Suda, he was described as a son of Linus, the son of Thracian Aethusa and in turn Pierus was the father of Oeagrus making him the grandfather of the musician Orpheus. His wife was known to be Methone, a nymph while others called her Pierus' sister. In the account of Antoninus Liberalis, Pierus sprung from the soil (an autochthon).

Most of the myths recounted Pierus to have fathered the Pierides by Antiope, nymph of Pieria or Euippe of Paionia. An unnamed daughter of Pierus was said to be the mother of Orpheus, not the Muse Calliope as what the Greeks believed according to Pausanias.

Mythology 
Pierus was famous for his daughters, the Emathides, nine maidens whom he named after the nine Muses. These girls, believing that their skills were a great match to the Muses, afterwards entered into a contest with the Muses. Being conquered, they were transformed into birds called Colymbas, Iyngx, Cenchris, Cissa, Chloris, Acalanthis, Nessa, Pipo, and Dracontis.

In the account of Pausanias, Pierus has emigrated from Thrace into Boeotia and established the worship of the Muses at Thespiae.

See also
 Pieres a Thracian tribe

Notes

References 
Antoninus Liberalis, The Metamorphoses of Antoninus Liberalis translated by Francis Celoria (Routledge 1992). Online version at the Topos Text Project.
Pausanias, Description of Greece with an English Translation by W.H.S. Jones, Litt.D., and H.A. Ormerod, M.A., in 4 Volumes. Cambridge, MA, Harvard University Press; London, William Heinemann Ltd. 1918. Online version at the Perseus Digital Library
Publius Ovidius Naso, Metamorphoses translated by Brookes More (1859-1942). Boston, Cornhill Publishing Co. 1922. Online version at the Perseus Digital Library.
Publius Ovidius Naso, Metamorphoses. Hugo Magnus. Gotha (Germany). Friedr. Andr. Perthes. 1892. Latin text available at the Perseus Digital Library.
William Smith. A Dictionary of Greek and Roman biography and mythology. s.v. Pierus. London (1873).
Autochthons of classical mythology
Kings in Greek mythology